The Variations on the name "Abegg" in F major is a piece (theme with variations) for piano by Robert Schumann, composed between 1829 and 1830 and published as his Opus 1. The name is believed to refer to Schumann's fictitious friend, Meta Abegg, whose surname Schumann used through a musical cryptogram as the motivic basis for the piece. The name Meta is considered to be an anagram of the word "tema" (Latin). Another suggestion is Pauline von Abegg. Apparently, when he was twenty years old, Schumann met her and dedicated this work to her, as witnessed in Clara Schumann's edition of her husband's piano works.

The first five notes of the theme are A, B (B), E, G, and G. This use of pitch names as letters was also used by Schumann in other compositions, such as his Carnaval.

It is composed of:

 Thema (Animato) (F major)
 Variations:
 (energico, F major)
 (il Basso parlando, F major)
 (corrente, F major)
 (cantabile, A-flat major)
 (Finale alla Fantasia (Vivace), F major)

References

External links
Pérez, Francisco Javier Plaza. Robert Schumann’s cyclic works: structural coherence and a new poetic approach to piano writing: Kinderzenen op. 15, Waldszenen op. 82, Abegg-Variationen op. 1 and Faschingswank aus Wien op. 26. Diss. Instituto Politécnico de Lisboa-Escola Superior de Música de Lisboa, 2018.

Performance of Variations on the name "Abegg" by Paavali Jumppanen from the Isabella Stewart Gardner Museum in MP3 format
 , Clara Haskil
 , Traum Piano

Piano music by Robert Schumann
Compositions for solo piano
1830 compositions
Abegg
Compositions in F major